Hadi Khani (also Romanized as Hādī Khānī; also known as Jahādābād) is a village in Ab Baran Rural District, Joulaki District, Aghajari County, Khuzestan Province, Iran. At the 2011 census, its population was 371, in 84 families.

References 

Populated places in Aghajari County